Irnfritz-Messern is a town in the district of Horn in Lower Austria, Austria.

Population

Tourism
Irnfritz-Messern is perhaps best known for its Eislaufplatz where people come to ice skate during the winter months. It is also home of the Schloss Wildberg.

References

External links 

Cities and towns in Horn District